North Dorset is a constituency represented in the House of Commons of the UK Parliament since 2015 by Simon Hoare, a Conservative.

History
This seat was created by the Redistribution of Seats Act 1885, since which it has been won at  elections by candidates from only two parties.  For nineteen of the years between 1885 and 1950, North Dorset was represented by Liberals, and at all other times since 1885 it has been represented by Conservatives. It is historically one of Labour's weakest seats in the country - for example, it gave the party its lowest vote share out of all the seats it contested in 1950 and 1951.

Constituency profile
The constituency covers North Dorset local government district and most (geographically) of East Dorset. It is largely rural, with a lower than average proportion of social housing and five small towns shown in the infobox.  The largest town is Verwood, and the most central is the market town of Blandford Forum, north of the port of Poole.

Boundaries

1885–1918: The Borough of Shaftesbury, the Sessional Divisions of Blandford, Shaftesbury, and Sturminster, and part of the Sessional Division of Sherborne.

1918–1950:  The Boroughs of Blandford Forum and Shaftesbury, the Urban District of Sherborne, the Rural Districts of Blandford, Shaftesbury, Sherborne, and Sturminster, and part of the Rural District of Wimborne and Cranborne.

1950–1974: The Boroughs of Blandford Forum and Shaftesbury, the Urban District of Wimborne Minster, and the Rural Districts of Blandford, Shaftesbury, Sturminster, and Wimborne and Cranborne.

1974–1983: As 1950 but with redrawn boundaries.

1983–1997: The District of North Dorset, the District of Wimborne wards of Colehill, Corfe Mullen Central, Corfe Mullen North, Corfe Mullen South, Crane, Holt, Sixpenny Handley, Sturminster Marshall, Vale of Allen, and Wimborne Minster, and the District of Purbeck wards of Lytchett Matravers and Lytchett Minster.

1997–2010: The District of North Dorset, and the District of East Dorset wards of Colehill, Crane, Holt, Longham, Sixpenny Handley, Stapehill, Sturminster Marshall, Vale of Allen, and Wimborne Minster.

2010–present: The District of North Dorset, and the District of East Dorset wards of Alderholt, Crane, Handley Vale, Holt, Stour, Three Cross and Potterne, Verwood Dewlands, Verwood Newtown, and Verwood Stephen's Castle.

Members of Parliament

Elections

Elections in the 2010s

Elections in the 2000s

Elections in the 1990s

Elections in the 1980s

Elections in the 1970s

Elections in the 1960s

Elections in the 1950s

Elections in the 1940s 

General Election 1939–40

Another General Election was required to take place before the end of 1940. The political parties had been making preparations for an election to take place and by the Autumn of 1939, the following candidates had been selected; 
Conservative: Angus Hambro
Liberal: Frank Byers
Labour: CL Lander

Elections in the 1930s

Elections in the 1920s

Elections in the 1910s

Elections in the 1900s

Elections in the 1890s

Elections in the 1880s

See also
 List of parliamentary constituencies in Dorset

Notes

References

Constituencies of the Parliament of the United Kingdom established in 1885
Parliamentary constituencies in Dorset